Denis Mangafic (born 12 December 1989) is a German footballer who plays as a midfielder or right back for FC Gießen.

References

External links
 

1989 births
Living people
German footballers
Footballers from Frankfurt
Association football fullbacks
Association football midfielders
SV Wehen Wiesbaden players
Kickers Offenbach players
FSV Frankfurt players
SC Preußen Münster players
FC Gießen players
Regionalliga players
2. Bundesliga players
3. Liga players
Oberliga (football) players
German expatriate footballers
Expatriate footballers in the Netherlands
German expatriate sportspeople in the Netherlands